Dykes is an unincorporated community in southwest Texas County, in the U.S. state of Missouri.  Dykes is located on Missouri Route 38, seven miles west of Houston.

History
A post office called Dykes was established in 1871, and remained in operation until 1933. The community's name is taken by John Dykes, a pioneer citizen.

References

Unincorporated communities in Texas County, Missouri
Unincorporated communities in Missouri